Narwee High School (abbreviation:NHS), known from 1958-1991 as Narwee Boys' High School (abbreviation:NBHS), is a former high school in the south-western Sydney suburb of Narwee, New South Wales, Australia.

Narwee High School operated as a boys' high school from January 1958 until December 1990. However, due to declining enrollments, the school became co-educational in January 1991. This was not a saving grace however, and due to a continuing decline in student numbers, the school was declared surplus to the needs of the New South Wales Department of Education and Training and was officially closed in December 2001. The closure was associated with the reorganisation of high schools in the district, and the formation of the Georges River College whereby students from various local high schools feed into a senior college campus.

On 5 November 2003, a major fire broke out on the top floor of a three-story building in the disused school causing extensive damage.  There are currently plans to redevelop the site for a mixture of low and medium density private housing, with preservation of some open space for public use.  In late 2005, demolition work commenced and was completed by March 2006.

Notable alumni 

 Tahir BilgiçAustralian comedian, film and television actor (class of 1986)
 Russell Dunlopprominent musician, singer, composer and record producer
 Richard Farleighfinancial investor, (class of 1978)
 Craig JamesChief Economist of Commsec (class of 1979)
 Mark Knighteditorial cartoonist for the Herald Sun (class of 1979)
 Morris Iemmaformer Premier of New South Wales from 2005-2008
 Graeme Rummanscricketer, has played for the NSW Blues and Victorian Bushrangers

References 

 Miranda Wood, "Sad farewell to the school that died", Sun Herald (Sydney, Australia), 9 December 2001

External links 
Narwee HS site development plan
Narwee High School Facebook group
NHS Facebook group

Defunct public high schools in Sydney
Educational institutions established in 1958
Educational institutions disestablished in 2001
1958 establishments in Australia
2001 disestablishments in Australia
South Western Sydney